Sinners and Saints may refer to:

 Sinners and Saints (album), by New York based punk/glam rock band Toilet Böys
 Sinners and Saints (film), 2010 film set in post-Katrina New Orleans

See also 
 Saints and Sinners (disambiguation)
 Sinner or a Saint, 2010 album by Tamar Kaprelian